Sébastien Proulx (born March 28, 1975) is a Canadian politician. He was an Action démocratique du Québec (ADQ) Member of the National Assembly of Quebec (MNA) for the electoral district of Trois-Rivières from 2007 to 2008. He is a lawyer and was the main political consultant to ADQ leader Mario Dumont until his election.

Background

Proulx has a bachelor's degree in law from the Université du Québec à Montréal and was admitted to the Barreau du Québec in 1999. He practised law for four years. He also worked in a consultation committee of Directeur général des élections du Québec.

Proulx first ran in the 2003 election in Laviolette, but finished third with 14 per cent of the vote behind Liberal incumbent Julie Boulet.

Member of the Provincial Legislature

In the 2007 election, Proulx ran again and was elected with 37% of the vote. Liberal incumbent André Gabias, finished second with 28% of the vote. During the campaign, Proulx was one of the ADQ's main spokespersons. He was previously the director of the party in 2004.

On March 29, 2007, Proulx was appointed Official Opposition House Leader and the critic for electoral reform and parliamentary reform.  On April 19, 2007, he was selected to be the Official Opposition's Shadow Minister for Access to Information.

Even though he was considered one of the ADQ's most effective parliamentarians and benefited from a high approval rating from his constituents, Proulx lost his seat as a result of the 2008 election.  He finished third with 19% of the vote.
Proulx subsequently rejoined the Quebec Liberal Party, and was the party's candidate in a 2015 by-election in Jean-Talon. On June 8, he was elected deputy of Jean-Talon.

In 2016, he was appointed Minister of Education, with Hélène David being responsible for Higher Education. He served until the Liberal government was defeated in 2018.

He resigned his seat in August 2019 citing family reasons.

Federal politics

Proulx campaigned on behalf of local Conservative candidate Claude Durand during the federal election of 2008.  Durand finished a distant second against Bloc Québécois incumbent Paule Brunelle in the district of Trois-Rivières.

Electoral record

Footnotes

External links
 
 Sébastien PROULX's blog

1975 births
Action démocratique du Québec MNAs
French Quebecers
Lawyers from Montreal
Living people
Members of the Executive Council of Quebec
Politicians from Montreal
Université du Québec à Montréal alumni
Quebec Liberal Party MNAs
21st-century Canadian politicians